The following is a list of events affecting Philippine television in 1987. Events listed include television show debuts, finales, cancellations, and channel launches, closures and rebrandings, as well as information about controversies and carriage disputes.

Events
January 27–29 – Rebel soldiers loyal to former president Ferdinand Marcos seized the GMA Network compound in Quezon City. The two-day plot ended in a skirmish, killing a rebel soldier and 35 others were hurt.
March 1 – ABS-CBN was relaunched as the Star Network.

Premieres
{| class="wikitable"
! Date
! Show
|-
| January 4
| Sic O'Clock News on IBC 13
|-
| January 5
| GMA News Live on GMA 7
|-
| January 10
| Kabuhayan Muna on ABS-CBN 2
|-
| January 11
| Tawag ng Tanghalan on ABS-CBN 2
|-
| January 14
| Straight from the Shoulder on GMA 7
|-
| February 22
| Shades on GMA 7
|-
| February 28
| Movie Magazine on GMA 7
|-
|rowspan="6"| March 2
| Gintong Kristal on GMA 7
|-
| Let's Go Crazy on ABS-CBN 2
|-
| Star Smile Factory on ABS-CBN 2
|-
| TV Patrol on ABS-CBN 2
|-
| Not so Late Night with Edu on ABS-CBN 2
|-
| Captain Barbell on RPN-9
|-
|rowspan=2"|March 3
| Palibhasa Lalake on ABS-CBN 2
|-
| Rumors: Facts and Humors on ABS-CBN 2
|-
|rowspan="2"|March 4
| Chika, Chika, Chicks on ABS-CBN 2
|-
| Loveli-Ness on ABS-CBN 2 
|-
| March 5
| Young Love, Sweet Love on RPN-9
|-
| March 6
| Probe on ABS-CBN 2
|-
| rowspan="4"| March 7
| Family Rosary Crusade on ABS-CBN 2
|-
| Martin and Pops Twogether on ABS-CBN 2
|-
| Dance–2–Nite on ABS-CBN 2
|-
|Super Suerte sa 9 on RPN 9
|-
| rowspan="2"|March 8
| Always, Snooky on ABS-CBN 2
|-
| Million Dollar Movies on ABS-CBN 2
|-
| April 20
|Afternoon Delight on ABS-CBN 2
|-
| April 24
| Mother Studio Presents on GMA 7
|-
| May 23
| Mga Kwento ni Lola on ABS-CBN 2
|-
| June 3
|Barrio Balimbing on ABS-CBN 2
|-
| August 1
| Saturday Shopping with Mr. and Ms. on ABS-CBN 2
|-
| August 13
| Chicks for Cats on IBC 13
|-
| September 7
| Agila on RPN 9
|-
| October 5
| Kapihan sa Nayon on IBC 13
|-
|rowspan="2" | October 26
| Pangunahing Balita on PTV 4
|-
| News on 4 on PTV 4
|-
| October 30
| Cloud Nine on RPN 9
|-
| November 6
| Apple Pie, Patis, Pate, Atbp. on RPN 9
|-
| November 11
| Balintataw on PTV 4
|-
| November 17
| Maricel Regal Drama Special on ABS-CBN 2
|-
| November 26
| Okay Ka, Fairy Ko! on IBC 13
|-
|}

Unknown date
April: Ang Pamilya Ko on ABS-CBN 2

UnknownNa-Kuh Eh, Eto nAPO Sila! on ABS-CBN 2Tonight with Merce on ABS-CBN 2Zsa Zsa on ABS-CBN 2Wanbol High on ABS-CBN 2Talents Unlimited on ABS-CBN 2Misis of the 80's on ABS-CBN 2Monday Night with Edu on ABS-CBN 2Malacañang This Week on ABS-CBN 2Plataporma at Isyu on IBC 13Public Forum on IBC 13Tapatan Kay Luis Beltran on IBC 13Regal Theatre on IBC 13Viva Telecine sa 13 on IBC 13Squad 13 on IBC 13Eh Kasi, Babae on IBC 13Hapi House! on IBC 13O, Sige! on IBC 13Pubhouse on IBC 13Working Girls on IBC 13Star Cafe on IBC 13Sesame Street on IBC 13Spectacular Action on Screen on IBC 13Kalatog sa Trese on IBC 13Penpen de Sarapen on RPN 9Ang Manok ni San Pedro on RPN 9Co-Ed Blues on RPN 9Agos on RPN 9Flordeluna: Book 2 on RPN 9Showbiz Talk of the Town on RPN 9Sining Siete on GMA 7Good Morning Showbiz on GMA 7Ang Say Mo... Mahalaga! on GMA 7Someone's on Your Side on GMA 7Golpe de Gulo on GMA 7Kaming Mga Ulila on GMA 7Velez This Week on GMA 7

Programs transferring networks

Finales
January 4: GMA News Digest on GMA 7
February 15: The Penthouse Live! on GMA 7
February 27:
 Balita Ngayon on ABS-CBN 2
 Amorsola on GMA 7
 Mirasol del Cielo on GMA 7
April 11: Andrea Amor on IBC 13
April 15: Nestle Special on ABS-CBN 2
August 22: Showbiz na Showbiz on ABS-CBN 2
September 4: Heredero on RPN 9
September 10: Mommy Ko, Daddy Ko! on ABS-CBN 2
September 11: Nine-Teeners on ABS-CBN 2
October 23:
 Early Evening Report on PTV 4
 Late Evening Report on PTV 4
November 10: Regal Drama Presents on ABS-CBN 2
December 16: Heartbeat on GMA 7
December 18: Probe on ABS-CBN 2

UnknownNa-Kuh Eh, Eto nAPO Sila! on ABS-CBN 2Tonight with Merce on ABS-CBN 2Triple Treat on ABS-CBN 2Mga Kwento ni Lola on ABS-CBN 2Parak on ABS-CBN 2Wanbol High on ABS-CBN 2Monday Night with Edu on ABS-CBN 2Business and Pleasure on ABS-CBN 2Kabuhayan Muna on ABS-CBN 2Malacañang This Week on ABS-CBN 2Plataporma at Isyu on IBC 13Truth Forum on IBC 13Hiyas on IBC 13Regal Theatre on IBC 13Squad 13 on IBC 13Chicks to Chicks on IBC 13Eh Kasi, Babae on IBC 13O, Sige! on IBC 13 Working Girls on IBC 13Star Cafe on IBC 13Scoop on IBC 13Ringside at Elorde on IBC 13Spectacular Action on Screen on IBC 13Gideon 300 on IBC 13Daigdig ng mga Artista sa Telebisyon on GMA 7Not So Late Night with Edu on GMA 7See True on GMA 7Interaction on GMA 7Weekend with Velez on GMA 7Christ is the Answer'' on GMA 7

Births
January 29 – DM Sevilla, actor
March 16 – Paw Diaz, former actress
March 27 – Markki Stroem. actor, singer and TV Personality
April 15 – Cathy Beltran, Broadcaster (Former 26K Model)
May 15 – Jennylyn Mercado, actress, singer, former Matinee Idol
June 1 – Johan Santos, actor and TV Host
June 7 - Lizzy Pecson
June 11 – Kean Cipriano, actor, commercial, endorsement
June 20 – Daiana Menezes, actress
August 9 – Hazel Uy
August 11 – Alyssa Alano, former actress
August 18 – Sam Y.G., Radio DJ, singer and TV host
August 23 – Nikki Gil, actress, endorsement, VTR Voice
August 30 – Czarina Balba (DJ Chacha), actress and radio DJ
September 13 – 
John James Uy, actor, TV Host, model
Marvin Barrameda, TV Host and actor
September 26 – Maricris Garcia, singer
September 29 – Max Eigenmann, actress, singer model
September 30 – Denise Laurel, actress, endorsement, commercial 
October 17 – Bea Alonzo, actress, endorsement, commercial
October 22 – Jade Lopez, actress
November 4 – Michelle Madrigal, actress
November 28 – Bianca Manalo, actress
December 19 – Slater Young, actor
December 21 –
Ryza Cenon, actress
Valerie Concepcion, actress
December 25 –
Bettina Carlos, actress
LJ Reyes, actress
December 30 – Jake Cuenca, actor, endorsement, VTR Voice, commercial, host

See also
1987 in the Philippines
1987 in television

References

 
Television in the Philippines by year
Philippine television-related lists